The Santa Fe Reporter (SFR) is an alternative weekly newspaper published in Santa Fe, New Mexico. First published in 1974, the Santa Fe Reporter features reports on local news, politics, art and culture, and is published once a week on Wednesdays. Since 1997, the Reporter has been owned and published by Portland, Oregon-based City of Roses Newspaper Company, which also publishes Willamette Week and Indy Week. Since September 2016, the paper's publisher & editor has been Julie Ann Grimm, with Anna Maggiore serving as associate publisher & advertising director. Julie Ann Grimm had previously been editor of the paper since August 2013. Alex De Vore has been covering music, arts and culture for the Reporter since 2008, and became culture editor in 2016. The Reporter celebrated its 40th anniversary in June 2014.

In late 2020, the paper moved from its downtown office to Pacheco Park.

Features
The Santa Fe Reporter publishes three glossy seasonal guides, including its magazine-style supplement, the Restaurant Guide. The paper also hosts several events in Santa Fe each year, such as expos and parties.

Notable stories
In 2007, Dan Frosch, now with The New York Times, won the Association of Alternative Newsweeklies' first-place prize (for under 60,000 circulation) for Investigative Reporting for his 15-part series, "The Wexford Files". The story, which investigated health care in New Mexico prisons, was instrumental in governor Bill Richardson's decision to end New Mexico's contract with Wexford.

In 2010, Corey Pein, wrote the story Khalsa vs Khalsa, the first article to examine the disputes within the 3HO community. 

In 2013, the Santa Fe Reporter filed a lawsuit against New Mexico Governor Susana Martinez, alleging violations of the state's Inspection of Public Records Act as well as a violation of the Free Press clause of the New Mexico Constitution.

Attorneys for the newspaper and the government argued in court in March 2017, and Judge Sara Singleton ruled in the case from her retirement in December of that year that the governor had broken the records law, but her actions did not violate the Constitution.

The Reporter works with a sister nonprofit, the New Mexico Fund for Public Interest Journalism, to provide journalism training for students. Its 2019 cohort was honored in 2020 by the Association of Alternative Newsmedia for the collaboration that covered sustainability programs at the Santa Fe Community College: “Roadmap to Resilience” by Olivia Abeyta, Max Looft, Anna Girdner, James Taylor under the direction of mentor and educator Julia Goldberg.

Awards
The Society of Professional Journalists Colorado chapter's "Top of the Rocky's" contest listed nine Santa Fe Reporter stories among its best in the region in 2017.

In 2008, at the Association of Alternative Newsweeklies (AAN) awards ceremony the Santa Fe Reporter received seven awards for editorial layout, illustration, arts criticism, columns and blogs. In 2009, the Reporter won five AAN awards, for its politics blog, for illustrations, for food writing, for "Innovation" and for the 2008 election blog, "Swing State of Mind".

References

Alternative weekly newspapers published in the United States
Newspapers published in New Mexico
Mass media in Santa Fe, New Mexico